Fernando Tirado Soto (born 1953) is a Chilean of Chango descent who was elected as a member of the Chilean Constitutional Convention.

References

External links
 Profile at Chile Constituyente

1953 births
Living people
21st-century Chilean politicians
Members of the Chilean Constitutional Convention